Gun culture refers to the attitudes, feelings, values and behaviour of a society, or any social group, in which guns are used. The term was first coined by Richard Hofstadter in an American Heritage article critiquing gun violence in the United States.

Local gun cultures are found all around the world, and attitudes toward guns vary greatly among places such as the United States, Canada, Israel, United Kingdom, Switzerland, Yemen, and Pakistan. Among the most studied and discussed global gun cultures is that of the United States.

Canada

Like British gun culture, Canadian gun culture largely emphasizes sport-shooting and hunting, rather than self-defense. Sport-shooting has always been a popular activity for both gun-owners and non-gun-owners in Canada. It is also a bridge and a leeway between American and British attitudes towards firearms. The provinces of Ontario, Quebec, and Alberta have large populations of hunters and shooters.

The Conservative Party, over the recent years, has been protective of the sport-shooting community, passing many bills that cater to their needs. In 2012, Bill C-19 eliminated the need to register "non-restricted" firearms (shotguns and regular rifles). In 2015, Bill C-42 converted "Possession-Only" licences to a regular firearms licence or a "Possession and Acquisition Licence", which includes the right to transport firearms to a shooting range without having to notify a chief firearms officer.

Most Canadians who own firearms use them for hunting or sport-shooting. Canadians have mixed opinions about using firearms for self-defence, and the legality of self-defence with a gun in Canada has been a subject of controversy and debate. After the incident of Ian Thomson, a gun owner who was arrested under murder and storage violations for shooting intruders with a firearm, the Canadian parliament amended the Criminal Code to make the use of force in self-defence legal. This finally made it legal for gun owners to use their firearms for self-defence, as technically "anything" within their disposal can be legally used—including firearms themselves. Canadians opposed to the use of firearms for personal protection argue that it is purely an American tradition. Yet despite the Criminal Code amendments, the firearms storage laws still make it rather difficult for citizens to use their firearms for home defence in a situation. In addition, it is still up to the Courts to decide whether the use of force in a situation was "justifiable".

Due to Canada's proximity to and close history and cultural ties with the United States, the cultural and socio-political environment surrounding firearms has recently begun to emulate American attitudes, where those who oppose stricter gun laws as well as the right to use guns for personal protection tend to vote for the Conservative Party as well as other right-leaning groups, and those who support stricter gun laws and are opposed to legalizing the use of firearms for self-defence tend to vote for the Liberal Party, New Democratic Party or other liberal and left-leaning groups in the country.

Although a "right to bear arms" is never explicitly stated in Canada's Charters of Freedom and Rights, conservative-leaning gun owners claim that a right to bear arms is present within the layers of the Canadian nation and Britain's historical documents. Licensed firearm owners share rights common to all other Canadians, including property and multi-cultural heritage rights.

There are many organizations in Canada dedicated to protecting sport-shooting and firearms ownership. These include the National Firearms Association (NFA), the Canadian Shooting Sports Association (CSSA) and the Canadian Coalition for Firearm Rights (CCFR). Out of the three, the NFA advocates self-defence with a firearm and has recently begun to emulate the National Rifle Association of America..

Czech Republic

The Czech Republic gun culture is unique, as it has relatively low firearm ownership per capita, but allows gun ownership for personal protection on shall issue basis, including concealed carry permits. Around 80% of the 300,000 Czech gun owners have an E category license, for personal protection. The reason for this is Czech history of being occupied by foreign powers, i.e. Nazi Germany and the Soviet Union, who did not allow most citizens to own guns. Liberal gun laws are also traditional in Czech lands, going with Imperial regulation No. 223 in 1852, which was used during the time of First Czechoslovak Republic. After the Velvet Revolution in 1989, the law was liberalized in 1995, when the legal right to own firearms was restored, and further in 2002, when many other types of firearms were legalized prior to Czech accession to EU, which required the law to be compatible with the European Firearms Directive.

There are two major organizations advocating for legal gun ownership, Lex – sdružení na ochranu práv majitelů zbraní, and Petice proti nesmyslným zákazům legálních zbraní – LIGA LIBE, which was formed by a team behind a petition against the European Firearms Directive, founded in 2014.

Greece
Gun culture in Greece varies greatly through different regions of the country. The country has strict gun laws, allowing gun ownership only for hunting purposes and people at high risk. However there is a strong gun culture in the island of Crete and the Mani peninsula.

Israel
Due to the history of Israel and the many wars it has fought, Israeli society has emphasized the need to be armed and well-trained. Amid the days leading up to Israel's creation, many Jewish paramilitary groups operated in Israel to protect their kibbutzim from Arab militants. These various groups would eventually merge to form the modern-day Israel Defense Forces. During the 2002 Intifada, guns were a common sight as civilians needed to protect themselves. However, the majority of Israeli gun culture is vested within the military and associated with serving in some armed service rather than a fringe militia. Men and women over the age of 18 (with exceptions), are required to serve in the Israel Defense Forces. As part of the terms of their service, Israeli soldiers are allowed to carry their firearms, on or off-duty, in uniform or without the uniform.

Israeli civilians who carry and own firearms are mostly Israeli settlers in the West Bank region of Palestine. Though on the other hand, Israeli gun laws are actually strict. A civilian would need to apply for a gun license, and demonstrate a need to own a firearm. Therefore, it is rather difficult for an average civilian to attain a firearms license, unless he/she lives in an area proven to be dangerous, or has the necessary military experience required by Israeli law.

Pakistan

Gun ownership, especially in the mountainous northwest, is part of traditional Pakistani culture. Rifles are handed down from generation to generation for hunting and for celebratory fire. In the 21st century, increases in terrorist threats, and particularly in urban kidnappings, extortions, and robberies, has led to an increase in civilian demand for guns for self-protection.

Russia
Russia also has a unique firearms culture, though that culture is dedicated heavily towards military use rather than to civilian ownership and much of it originates from the Soviet Union (paradoxically an era of strict gun control) and their war against Nazi Germany. Russia prides itself in having produced some of the world's most famous firearms, most notably the AK-47 and PPSh-41. During the days of the Russian Empire, many people living in the Ural Mountains owned firearms for hunting and training and at one point, Russia had a very high civilian firearms ownership rate.

During World War II, and the years building up to it, saw a surge in firearms culture in the Soviet Union. Rifle-training and marksmanship was seen as a symbol of fighting honor for the Soviet motherland, and later were a source of influence for sniping schools in the United States. During the Battle of Stalingrad, the city's fate also relied on local militias. Firearms were also part of military propaganda, such as in the case of the famous Soviet sniper Vasily Zaytsev. Soviet snipers were essential and important to the Soviet strategy against the German invasion.

Today, the legacy of Russian weaponry is very popular with firearms enthusiasts in the United States and the world, and are some of the most discussed firearms by historians.

The emergence of the AK-47 as one of the world's most popular assault rifles has presented a stereotype of Russians as wielding AK-47s and having a gun culture similar to America. However, the reality of the situation presents the opposite, according to a survey done by the Zircon public opinion research group, over 70% of Russians were opposed to the right to bear arms.

Switzerland

Males with ages between 18 and 30 are conscripted and can choose to do the military service and – as part of that – can keep their issued firearms at home.

The SAT (lit. shooting and off-duty activities) oversees lessons in which every Swiss child in the year of their 15th anniversary to the year of their 20th or the one in which they begin their conscription can learn how to shoot with the SIG SG 550. This activity is free and the Young Shooters are able to take home the rifle between the lessons if they are 17. However, the bolt has to stay at the range in which they attend the lesson. This activity takes place over a span of six years in three-to-four month periods per year and, if wanted, they can pursue and become instructors for the new generation of Young Shooters.

Switzerland holds the biggest gun-fest in the world: the Eidgenössisches Feldschiessen. This competition takes place annually and in 2012 they counted 130,000 participants. Every Swiss who is 10 or older can take part at any federal ranges and will be able to shoot for free with the ordinance rifle.

Guns are widely used for competition in sport-shooting. In 2016 SwissOlympics conducted a study on clubs and members in Switzerland: the Swiss Sport Shooting Federation is ranked 2nd in terms of clubs and 9th in terms of members. Those affiliated with the Federation are shooters who require a license in order to compete.

United Kingdom

The U.K. gun culture is mostly represented by shooting sports. Clay-pigeon shooting is one of the more popular sports and shotguns are by far the most common form of firearm. In March 2021, official figures reported there being 1.3million legally held shotguns in circulation, compared with around 358,000 rifles.  Firearms are predominantly very popular among the rural communities. However outside of the rural areas, the society is overwhelmingly anti-gun, and many anti-gun advocates come from Britain.

Outside of Northern Ireland, self-defence is not considered a "good reason" for the issuing of a firearm certificate, although the use of a legally held firearm in an act of self-defence is not itself unlawful. Outside of Northern Ireland, Police officers are not routinely armed with firearms, and are supported by Authorised firearms officers where the situation requires an armed response.

The main sport-shooting organization in the United Kingdom is the National Rifle Association (not to be confused for or in any way related to the American organization of the same name).

United States

Gun ownership in the United States is constitutionally protected by the Second Amendment to the United States Constitution. Firearms are widely used in the United States of America for self-defense, hunting, and recreational uses, such as target shooting.  Gun politics is polarized between advocates of gun rights, typically conservative, and those who support stricter gun control, usually liberal. The gun culture of the United States can be considered unique among developed countries, in terms of the large number of firearms owned by civilians and generally permissive regulations.

Yemen
Yemen's gun culture is very similar to that of Pakistan's, in that firearms ownership is not only used for self-defense, but also used in celebratory fire. Guns also had a higher demand after the 2011 uprisings and other political insecurities throughout the country. Owning a firearm in Yemen is seen in a positive light, as society views it as a symbol of manhood and leadership. Tribesman even carry their firearms to mediate disputes between other tribal leaders.

See also

 Gun ownership
 History of the firearm
 Index of gun politics articles
 List of countries by firearm-related death rate
 Overview of gun laws by nation

References

External links
 Collins English Dictionary definition of "gun culture"
 Open fire: Understanding global gun cultures

Firearm laws
Gun politics
History of subcultures